Escoumins may refer to:

Toponyms

Canada

Quebec 
Les Escoumins, a municipality of Côte-Nord (North-Shore)
 Petits-Escoumins, a hamlet of the municipality Les Escoumins
 Township Les Escoumins (designated « Escoumins » in the past), a township located in Les Escoumins
 Escoumins River, a river in the municipality of Les Escoumins
 Petits-Escoumins River, a river flowing in the municipality of Les Escoumins
 Zec de la Rivière-des-Escoumins, a zone d'exploitation contrôlée (controlled harvesting zone) located in Les Escoumins
 Escoumins Bay, a bay located in municipality of Les Escoumins
 Large sandbar Escoumins (Grande batture des Escoumins), a sandbar of St. Lawrence River located in municipality of Les Escoumins
 Rare forest of Escoumins (Forêt rare des Escoumins), an exceptional forest ecosystem located in the municipality of Les Escoumins
 Escoumins Power Station, a station of power distribution, located in municipality of Les Escoumins
 Lake Small-Escoumins, located in the unorganized territory of the Lac-au-Brochet, in administrative region of Côte-Nord (North-Shore)
 Escoumins Dam, a dam built in La Tuque, in Mauricie
 Des Escoumins street located in Gatineau, in administrative region of Outaouais
 Des Escoumins street, located in Terrebonne, in administrative region of Lanaudière
 Des Escoumins street, located in Quebec, in administrative region of Capitale-Nationale

Anciens noms 
Les Escoumins, Quebec (Indian reserve), old name of actual Indian Reserve of Essipit, Quebec on Côte-Nord (North-Shore)
 Lake des Escoumins, old name of Bastien Lake, located in La Tuque